Sevgi Çınar (born January 15, 1994) is a Turkish female footballer who plays for Beşiktaş of the Turkish Women's First Football League with jersey number 77. She was part of the Turkey women's U-19 national football team before she entered the Turkey women's national team. She studied physical education and sports at the Dokuz Eylül University in İzmir.

Early life 
Çınar was born on January 15, 1994, in Seyhan district of Adana Province to Murat Çınar, who played football in Adana Demirspor. She became interested in football as she accompanied her father to futsal games. At the age of 13, she was discovered by Tevfik Işık, coach of Adana İdmanyurduspor, while she was playing football in the school. In the beginning, her father complied with Sevgi's devotion to football, but her mother objected. She was persuaded by coach Işık. Following her achievements, the parents supported her more and more.

Club career 

In January 2012, Çınar left Adana İdmanyurduspor, where she began her football career, and accepted an offer of Konak Belediyespor. She joined the team in Izmir, and appeared in her new team's play-off matches already in the  2012–13 season of Women's First League. She played in three matches of the 2015–16 UEFA Women's Champions League qualifying round, and scored one goal.

At the end of the 2015–16 season, she enjoyed her team's champion title. She played in three matches of the Group 9 of the 2016–17 UEFA Women's Champions League qualifying round. Following the play-off round, the 2016–17 season ended for her team as the champion fifth time in a row,  and she became "top scorer" for the second time.

By October 2017, she transferred to the Istanbul-based club Ataşehir Belediyespor.

Çınar took part at the 2018–19 UEFA Women's Champions League qualifying round. She played in all three matches of the qualification round, and scored one goal.

In October 2018, she joined the recently to the Women's First League promoted club ALG Spor in Gaziantep.

She was transferred by the 2018–19 Women's First League champion Beşiktaş J.K. to play in the 2019–20 UEFA Women's Champions League - Group 9 matches. She scored one goal against the Armenian Alashkert. She could not play in the entire 2020-21 Turkcell Women's Football League season due to a cruciate ligament rupture on her left leg, she contracted during a national team camp before the beginning of the regular league season. She underwent a surgery late January 2021. Recovering from her injury, she appeared in a friendly match before the beginning of the 2021-22 Super League season. In December 2021, before the beginning of the 2021-22 Women's Super League, she underwent a surgery on her keft knee due to the repeated anterior cruciate ligament injury.

International career 

She debuted in the Turkey Girls' U-17 national team playing in the friendly match against Bulgaria on July 1, 2009. Çınar scored a total of five goals in two friendly matches against Moldova in August 2009. At the 2011 UEFA Women's U-17 Championship – Group 6 matches in Belgium, she scored three goals in the match against the Armenian nationals that ended 7–0 for the Turkish side.

After appearing twelve times for the U-17 national team, she played in the U-19 team for the first time in the 2011 UEFA Women's U-19 Championship Second qualifying round – Group 3 match against Germany on April 2, 2011. In the friendly match against the U-19 team from Wales, Sevgi Çınar scored the only goal for Turkey in September 2012.

She scored a goal for Konak Belediyespor in the preliminary group match of 2013–14 UEFA Women's Champions League against the Bulgarian team FC NSA Sofia. Çınar shot also a goal against RTP Unia Racibórz from Poland in the Round-32 of the same championship. On November 28, 2013, Çınar scored the first goal for Turkey in the 2015 FIFA Women's World Cup qualification – UEFA Group 6 match against Montenegron team that ended with 3–1.

Çınar took part in three matches of the 2019 FIFA Women's World Cup qualification – UEFA preliminary round.

Career statistics 
.

Honours

Club
 Turkish Women's First League
 Konak Belediyespor
 Winners (5): 2012–13, 2013–14, 2014–15, 2015–16, 2016–17

 Ataşehir Belediyespor
 Winners (1): 2017–18

 ALG Spor
 Runners-up (1): 2018–19

Individual
 Top scorer 2010–11 Women's First League  with Adana İdmanyurduspor
 Top scorer 2016–17 Women's First League  with Konak Belediyespor

References

External links 

Sevgi Çınar at Turkish Football Federation

1994 births
Living people
People from Seyhan
Sportspeople from Adana
Dokuz Eylül University alumni
Turkish women's footballers
Women's association football midfielders
Turkish Women's Football Super League players
Adana İdmanyurduspor players
Konak Belediyespor players
Ataşehir Belediyespor players
ALG Spor players
Beşiktaş J.K. women's football players
Turkey women's international footballers